The Backus-Marblemount Ranger Station House No. 1010 is in Mount Baker-Snoqualmie National Forest, in the U.S. state of Washington. Constructed by the United States Forest Service in 1933, the ranger station was inherited by the National Park Service when North Cascades National Park was dedicated in 1968. The ranger station was placed on the National Register of Historic Places in 1989.

The front entrance has a small, "gable-roofed entrance
portico with arched stickwork in pediment, supported by wrought iron posts," while the north entrance also had a small gable supported by a king post truss. The gable ends to the east and west are sheathed in board and batten style siding.

References

Park buildings and structures on the National Register of Historic Places in Washington (state)
Buildings and structures completed in 1933
Buildings and structures in Skagit County, Washington
National Register of Historic Places in Skagit County, Washington
Mount Baker-Snoqualmie National Forest